All India Sunni Jamiyyathul Ulama, or All India Muslim Scholars Association, is one of the principal Sunni-Shafi'i scholarly bodies in northern Kerala. The council administers Shafi'ite mosques, institutes of higher religious learning (the equivalent of north Indian madrasas) and madrasas (institutions where children receive basic Islamic education) in Kerala.

Kanthapuram A. P. Aboobacker Musliyar currently serves as the general secretary of All India Sunni Jamiyyathul Ulama. He also leads the Markazu Saquafathi Sunniyya in Kozhikode.

Wings 

 Scholarly bodies
 Samastha Kerala Sunni Jamiyyathul Ulama affiliated to All India Sunni Jamiyyathul Ulama
 Kerala Muslim Jama'ath
 Mahallu federation — Sunni Management Association
 Educational board  
 Samastha Kerala Sunni Vidhyabhyasa Board 
 Islamic Educational Board of India
 Madrasa teachers' association — Sunni Jamiyyathul Muallimeen 
 Youth wing — Samastha Kerala Sunni Yuvajana Sangham (S. Y. S.)
 Student wing — Sunni Students Federation (S. S. F.)
 Children's wing — Sunni Bala Sangham (Mazhavil Sangham)
 Mouthpiece (daily) — Siraj

References 

Islam in Kerala
Sunni Islam in India